Clanger is a colloquial term for 'mistake'. 

It may also refer to:

 Clangers, a television series by Oliver Postgate and Peter Firmin
 Traditional nickname for a person local to Bedfordshire, England
 Bedfordshire clanger, a traditional dumpling containing meat and apple (or jam)
 Clanger (Australian rules football), a term coined by Champion Data founder Ted Hopkins which refers to a turnover or a mistake made by a player. 
 A trance group founded by Simon Berry